Scrobipalpa hoenei is a moth in the family Gelechiidae. It was described by Oleksiy V. Bidzilya and Hou-Hun Li in 2010. It is found in Yunnan, China.

References

Scrobipalpa
Moths described in 2010